David Slifer is an American college women's basketball coach at the University of Central Missouri. During his 14 seasons at Central Missouri, Slifer has led the Jennies to one national championship, four conference regular season championships and eight NCAA tournament appearances. Prior to his current post, Slifer was the head coach for Mid-America Intercollegiate Athletics Association-rival Missouri Western from 1995 to 2004, and was the head coach at his alma mater Mount Mercy University from 1989 to 1995.

Career

Mount Mercy University 
Slifer, a Charleston, Illinois native, began his coaching career at his alma mater Mount Mercy University in 1989. While at Mount Mercy, Slifer led Mount Mercy to six consecutive conference championships, six winning seasons for 28 or more wins, and no more than six losses. With the exception of his first year, Slifer led the Mustangs to the NAIA Tournament finishing in the Final Four during his last two seasons.

Missouri Western State College 
In March 1995, Slifer was announced as the next head coach at Missouri Western State College, an NCAA Division II school competing in the Mid-America Intercollegiate Athletics Association. During his nine seasons at Missouri Western, Slifer led the women's basketball program to two regular season championships, three conference tournament championships, seven NCAA Division II Tournament appearances, and was the MIAA Coach of the Year award in 1997 and 2002. Slifer left after the 2003–04 season.

University of Central Missouri 
In April 2004, Slifer was named the head coach at MIAA-rival Central Missouri State University. During his time at Central Missouri, Slifer has led the Jennies basketball program to two regular season championships, eight NCAA Division II Tournament appearances, and one national championship. Slifer won his third MIAA Coach of the Year Award in 2018.

Head coach record

References

External links
 Central Missouri profile

Living people
American women's basketball coaches
Basketball coaches from Illinois
Mount Mercy University alumni
Mount Mercy Mustangs women's basketball coaches
Missouri Western Griffons women's basketball coaches
Central Missouri Jennies basketball coaches
People from Charleston, Illinois
Year of birth missing (living people)